Sagicor Financial Company Ltd, traded as , is a financial services conglomerate operating in United States, Latin America and the Caribbean region.

Sagicor Financial Company Ltd. is a leading financial services provider in the Caribbean, with over 180 years of history, and has a growing presence as a provider of life insurance products in the United States. Sagicor offers a wide range of products and services, including life, health, and general insurance, annuities, pension administration, banking, and investment management. Sagicor operates through the following three segments: Sagicor Jamaica, Sagicor Life USA, and Sagicor Life. Geographically, the firm operates in Jamaica, the United States, Barbados, Trinidad & Tobago, and other countries in the Caribbean.

Founded in 1840, Barbados Mutual Life Assurance Society was established and for fifty branches of the organization were opened in St Vincent, Trinidad and Tobago, Grenada, St Kitts, Antigua, Montserrat, Jamaica and Guyana. After over 150 years of operations throughout the Caribbean, the Barbados Mutual Life Assurance Society acquired interest in, and established a number of companies including, Mutual Bank of the Caribbean, Capital International Management Service and Island Life in Jamaica.

External links 
 Official site

Financial services companies established in 1849
Companies listed on the Barbados Stock Exchange
Financial services companies of Barbados
1849 establishments in the British Empire
1840s establishments in the Caribbean